, provisional designation , is a sub-kilometer asteroid, classified as a near-Earth object of the Amor group, estimated to measure approximately  in diameter. It was discovered on 18 June 2013, by astronomers with the Pan-STARRS survey at Haleakala Observatory on the island of Maui, Hawaii, in the United States. It was the 10,000th near-Earth object ever discovered.

Orbit and classification 

 is an Amor asteroid – a subgroup of near-Earth asteroids that approach the orbit of Earth from beyond, but do not cross it. It orbits the Sun at a distance of 1.3–1.8 AU once every 23 months (707 days; semi-major axis of 1.55 AU). Its orbit has an eccentricity of 0.18 and an inclination of 29° with respect to the ecliptic. The body's observation arc begins with its official discovery observation at Haleakala in June 2013.

Close approaches 

It also makes close approaches to Mars. With an aphelion of 1.83 AU, it is also a Mars-crossing asteroid.

10,000th discovered NEO 

 was the 10,000th near-Earth object (NEO) ever discovered in June 2013 and considered a significant milestone in exploring the NEO population.

Numbering and naming 

This minor planet was numbered by the Minor Planet Center on 31 January 2018 and received the number  in the minor planet catalog. As of 2019, it has not been named.

Physical characteristics

Diameter and albedo 

 measures approximately 300 meters in diameter for an absolute magnitude of 20.1 and an assumed albedo 0.18, which is typical value for stony asteroids. A generic magnitude-to-diameter conversion on a wider range of possible albedos (0.30 to 0.05) gives a diameter between 230 and 570 meters. As of 2019, no rotational lightcurve of  has been obtained from photometric observations. The object's effective size, rotation period, pole and shape remain unknown.

References

External links 
 List Of Amor Minor Planets (by designation), Minor Planet Center
 
 
 

511002
511002
20130618
20130618